La Recherche is a monthly French language popular science magazine covering recent scientific news. It is published by the Société d'éditions scientifiques (the Scientific Publishing Group), a subsidiary of Financière Tallandier. Tallandier is owned by Artémis, an investment company of François-Henri Pinault. The headquarters is in Paris.

History
Created in 1946 Under the name Atomes (Atoms), it changed its name to the current La Recherche in 1970. The first issue with the title was published in May 1970. It absorbed the French journal Nucleus, formerly La Revue Scientifique de France et de l'étranger (the Scientific Journal of France and Abroad) in 1971, followed by Science Progrès, Découverte, formerly La Nature in 1973. La Recherche is published monthly. The website of the magazine was started in 1995.

References

External links
  Official website
 Summaries and history of La Recherche and its ancestors

This article incorporates text from the French language Wikipedia article La Recherche.

1946 establishments in France
French-language magazines
Monthly magazines published in France
Magazines established in 1946
Magazines published in Paris
Popular science magazines